The British Society for the Philosophy of Religion (BSPR) was founded in 1993 and is the United Kingdom's main forum for the interchange of ideas in the philosophy of religion. The current president is Maria Rosa Antognazza of the King's College London.

The society holds a major conference in Britain every two years, devoted to a particular area of the subject. The programme of events for the society is decided at the general meeting held at the biennial conference. The planning of the programme is in the hands of the committee.

The BSPR is also affiliated to the European Society for Philosophy of Religion which holds a biennial conference in years alternating with the BSPR's conference.

Presidents

 1993–1996: Roger Trigg
 Richard Swinburne
 2003–2005: Peter Byrne
 Basil Mitchell
 John Hick
 Paul Helm
 Brian Leftow
 2007–2009: John Cottingham
 Robin Le Poidevin
 2011–2013: Stephen R. L. Clark
 2013–2015: Sarah Coakley
 2015–2017: Mark Wynn
 2017–2019: Yujin Nagasawa
 2019–present: Maria Rosa Antognazza

References

External links
 

1993 establishments in the United Kingdom
Organizations established in 1993
Philosophical societies in the United Kingdom
Philosophy of religion